St. Elmo Murray Haney (April 1898 – January 31, 1979) was a master gunnery sergeant in the United States Marine Corps. As a veteran of many early campaigns in the Marine Corps, he was considered the epitome of the "old breed" Marine and a source of inspiration during the tough battles of the Pacific Campaign in World War II. Author and fellow Marine Eugene Sledge described Haney as "not a man born of woman, but that God had issued him to the Marine Corps."

Early life and education
Haney was born in Chickalah, Arkansas. Before and after his service during World War I, Haney attended the Arkansas State Normal School, a teacher training college, where he played on the baseball team. He later graduated from Chillicothe Business College in Missouri.

Military career

World War I
Haney enlisted in the United States Marine Corps on July 17, 1918 and trained at Parris Island, South Carolina and Quantico, Virginia. By October 1918, he had been assigned to the 2nd Separate Machine Gun Battalion at Quantico. Although multiple sources, including Eugene Sledge, claim that Haney saw combat in World War I, the war ended before Haney could be sent to Europe. On May 16, 1919, he was transferred to Marine Barracks, Boston and discharged.

Inter-war period
After teaching school in Arkansas for four years, Haney re-enlisted in the Marine Corps on October 22, 1927 at San Diego, California. By 1930, he was stationed in Shanghai and played in the outfield for the 4th Marine Regiment baseball team. In 1933, he was transferred from Marine Corps Base San Diego to Marine Barracks Mare Island, also playing on the baseball team there.

Haney also saw duty in Nicaragua, Iceland, and the Amazon.

World War II
In World War II, Haney fought in the battles of Guadalcanal, Cape Gloucester and Peleliu with Company K, 3rd Battalion, 5th Marines, where he was one of the oldest to fight in the regiment. Although Haney held the rank of platoon sergeant, he was not assigned to any specific sub-unit, serving as a roving senior combat leader in the company.

Eugene Sledge noted many eccentric "old breed" behaviors from Haney, including scrubbing his genitals with a stiff brush, field stripping and cleaning his rifle compulsively, talking to himself,  and being "obsessed with bayoneting the enemy." Sledge witnessed Haney, a non-commissioned officer, angrily throw coral gravel into the face of a second lieutenant, furiously berating him for not keeping his pistol pointed downrange during a firing exercise. During battle, Sledge described Haney as "everywhere at once, correcting mistakes and helping out."

At the Battle of Peleliu, Haney rallied his Marines as they got bogged down and kept them moving forward. At the conclusion of the fighting, Sledge asked Haney what he thought of the battle as they shared a cigarette, looking at Peleliu from their ship's railing:

Haney shipped out of Peleliu on November 29, 1944, and was transferred stateside after being promoted to gunnery sergeant.

Silver Star citation
At the Battle of Cape Gloucester, Haney received a Silver Star for heroic actions against the enemy, carrying ammunition to the front lines during the thickest of the fighting for Walt's Ridge. The citation reads:

Death and legacy
Ethel, Haney's wife, died on July 14, 1972, in Bentonville, Arkansas. Haney died January 31, 1979, in Fayetteville, Arkansas, and was buried in Benton County Memorial Cemetery in Rogers, Arkansas.

In 2010, Haney was portrayed by actor Gary Sweet in three episodes of the HBO miniseries The Pacific. Haney's character in the series was built largely from recollections in Eugene Sledge's memoir With the Old Breed: At Peleliu and Okinawa.

References

Citations

Bibliography

 
 
 

1898 births
1979 deaths 
United States Marine Corps personnel of World War I
United States Marine Corps personnel of World War II
Chillicothe Business College alumni
People from Yell County, Arkansas
Recipients of the Silver Star
United States Marine Corps non-commissioned officers
Military personnel from Arkansas